Battle of Dominica may refer to:
Invasion of Dominica (1761) in the Seven Years' War
Invasion of Dominica (1778) in the American War of Independence
Battle of the Saintes or Bataille de Dominique, a battle of 1782